Point Cloates, formerly known as Cloate's Island, is a peninsula approximately 100 kilometres south south-west of North West Cape, in the Pilbara region of Western Australia. It features Point Cloates Lighthouse and the ruins of a previous lighthouse (built in 1910); both buildings are on Cloates Hill, which rises 41 metres (134.5 feet) above sea level.

During the 17th and 18th centuries, the first European mariners to see Point Cloates believed the area between the point and North West Cape to be a small island, which became known to them as "Cloat's Island" (see above). The "island" was often confused with other geographical features; these errors led to it being mismapped, as well as suggestions that its existence was doubtful, or that it was a phantom island.

The first Europeans to report seeing the point, in 1618, were Captain Lenaert Jacobszoon and supercargo Willem Janszoon, in the Dutch East India Company ship Mauritius.

On 1 May 1622, John Brooke, captain of Tryall claimed to have sighted an island in the area, while en route from England to Batavia (Jakarta), in the Dutch East Indies. (Tryall was wrecked shortly afterwards, on the rocks that now bear its name, north of the Montebello Islands.)

The name "Cloate's" or "Cloat's Island" originated with a European mariner named Nash, who in 1719 named it after one of the owners of his vessel, a Flemish "baron". Nash is believed to have been English, and the spelling may be an anglicisation of the Flemish surname Cloot.  Nash was commanding a "Flemish" (probably Austrian Netherlands) ship, House of Austria, en route from Ostend to a port in China. Nash estimated that the island was "32 leagues" (approximately 180 kilometres) in length.

Guthrie's world map of 1785 shows the island at 97° east longitude, due south of Keeling Island, which is 16 degrees west and more than 1,600 kilometres east of Point Cloates. Such errors led some cartographers to classify Cloats Island as a "doubtful" or "phantom island". For instance, James Horsburgh wrote in The India Directory, first published in 1809, that: "Cloates Island very probably has no real existence."

Uncertainty regarding the location and nature of the "island" may have contributed to the loss of the Portuguese Navy aviso Correio da Azia, bound for Macau in 1816. After running aground on Ningaloo Reef, Correio was abandoned and later sank.

In 1827, Phillip Parker King suggested that the island was a peninsula. Nevertheless, "Cloates Island" remained on some later marine charts and world maps.

In 1887 the ship SS Perth (formerly SS Penola), was wrecked near the cape.

The ruins of the first Point Cloates Lighthouse, built in 1910, are listed in the Western Australian register of heritage places (2005).

In 1912, the Western Australian government granted a whaling licence to a Norwegian company to operate whaling stations at Frenchman's Bay near Albany and Norwegian Bay (near Point Cloates).

Footnotes

Exploration of Western Australia
Cloates Island
Pilbara Coast
Maritime history of Western Australia
Whaling stations in Australia